Aisling O'Neill is an Irish actress. She has portrayed Carol Foley in Fair City for more than two decades.

O'Neill's portrayal of Carol earns her personal letters of admiration and bought her an IFTA nomination for Best Female Performance in a Soap or Comedy.

Originally from Dublin, O'Neill lives in Gorey, County Wexford. She is a mother of one.

See also
 List of longest-serving soap opera actors#Ireland

References

External links
 

Year of birth missing (living people)
Living people
Actresses from Dublin (city)
Actresses from County Wexford
Irish soap opera actresses
Irish television actresses
21st-century Irish actresses